PeakBiety Branding + Advertising is an independent advertising agency focusing on brand perception. The headquarters are located in downtown Tampa, Florida and the agency serves a variety of sectors including healthcare, technology, financial services, manufacturing and professional services.

Timeline
March 1, 1990 - Glen Peak and Mike Biety start the agency with no clients and PeakBiety applies to join American Association of Advertising Agencies (4As).

1990 - PeakBiety receives collateral-only assignments from Nokia (U.S.), which was then based in Largo, Florida

1991 - Agency works with Florida Interchange Group, better known as the Honor EFT system, to build the concept of debit transactions.

1991–1995 - PeakBiety and Nokia (U.S.) achieve first U.S. network cable TV campaign and Nokia becomes the #2 brand behind then-leader Motorola.

June 1992 - PeakBiety named agency of record for Kawasumi Labs, a medical device company.

July 1992 - Agency becomes a full-fledged member of the 4A's after a 2-year wait.

February 1993 - Agency wins Judge's Choice awards for Nokia print campaign at the ADDY Awards.

1995 - Agency wins National ADDY Awards for Nokia television commercial entitled “Ping Pong.”

March 1997 - Donette Arcos, current media director, joins as promotions specialist.

1999 - Agency begins a relationship with H. Lee Moffitt Cancer Center and Research Institute, which is based in Tampa, FL.

1999 - Agency wins “Small Business of the Year” award from the Greater Tampa Chamber of Commerce.

2000 - Agency celebrates its 10th year and performs pro-bono work for American Cancer Society for their development of Hope Lodge on the University of South Florida Campus. Also, agency helps Nokia Latin America conduct a Shakira Tour.

2001 - Agency achieves its first software company assignment with HTE (now SunGard) and starts agency's expertise with software clients.

2003 - Agency begins work with Tampa Electric Company (TECO) to promote adoption of energy conservation programs.

2005 - Amy Phillips, current creative director, joins agency, initially as associate creative director.

2005 - PeakBiety receives first Best of Show ADDY given to a piece in the direct marketing category.

2006 - Original partner, Mike Biety, retires.

2009 - Agency moves offices to downtown Tampa and hires Kathryn Clark as art director.

2013 - David Alonso joins the creative team as an art director.

February 2018 - James Greenwood joins the creative team as an art director.

Membership
PeakBiety is a member of the American Association of Advertising Agencies (4As) and is one of the only agencies in the area to hold such a membership. The agency was founded in 1990 by Glen Peak and Mike Biety after both having worked for many years in large national agencies. It grew steadily through the 1990s by managing high-profile accounts.

Awards
 1993 - Judge's Choice award for Nokia print campaign
 1995 - National ADDY Awards for Nokia
 2001 - 3 Best of Bay, 8 Gold, 5 Silver and 1 Tucker ADDY Awards from the Tampa Bay Advertising Federation
 2002 - 1 Best of the Bay, 1 Gold, 1 Silver ADDY Awards from the Tampa Bay Advertising Federation
 2003 - 5 Gold and 6 Silver ADDY Awards from the Tampa Bay Advertising Federation
 2004 - 1 Best of Category and 2 Gold District ADDY Awards ; 2 Best of Bay, 2 Gold and 5 Silver ADDY Awards from the Tampa Bay Advertising Federation; 2 American Corporate Identity Awards for the agency's logo and letterhead design
 2005 - 1 Best of Show, 3 Best of Bay, 7 Gold, and 4 Silver ADDY Awards from the Tampa Bay Advertising Federation
 2006 - National ADDY Awards for Moffitt Cancer Center; Gold District ADDY Awards; 17 ADDY Awards from the Tampa Bay Advertising Federation
 2008 - 1 Gold and 8 Silver ADDY Awards from the Tampa Bay Advertising Federation
 2009 - Gold District ADDY Awards for interactive campaign created for the Cancer Research Alliance; 4 Silver ADDY Awards from the Tampa Bay Advertising Federation

References

External links
PeakBiety Official Site
Reputation Management

Advertising agencies of the United States